This article documents statistics from the 1991 Rugby World Cup, jointly hosted by England, Scotland, Wales, Ireland and France from 3 October to 2 November.

Team statistics
The following table shows the team's results in major statistical categories.

Source: ESPNscrum.com

Top point scorers

Top try scorers

Hat-tricks
Unless otherwise noted, players in this list scored a hat-trick of tries.

Stadiums

See also
 1995 Rugby World Cup statistics
 Records and statistics of the Rugby World Cup
 List of Rugby World Cup hat-tricks

External links
Rugby World Cup 1991 Tournament statistics
Rugby World Cup 1991 Team Stats

References

Statistics
Rugby union records and statistics